Simalia clastolepis, also known as the Moluccan python or yellow python, is a species of python found in Indonesia. They can grow to be 8–9 feet in length.

Description
As hatchlings they have a red in color, which then turns from brown to yellow, then as adults, will get black along their spine. They can also be patternless or striped.

References

clastolepis
Reptiles described in 2000